North Bay is a small Unincorporated community located on Lake Michigan in the town of Liberty Grove in northern Door County, Wisconsin. The North Bay State Natural Area along with a few resorts are located within the vicinity of the community. A Native American name for North Bay is "Wah-Sa-Ke-Ta-Ta-Wong", or "Burning Island".

Climate

Photo of North Bay State Natural Area

References

Unincorporated communities in Wisconsin
Unincorporated communities in Door County, Wisconsin